LaunchU (also known as Launch Unit/Launch-U) is a proposed size/mass class standard for small satellites.

In 2017, The Aerospace Corporation (Aerospace) held discussions with members of the satellite launch community to tackle difficult problems in the spaceflight industry such as "Why can't I get a slot and launch tomorrow?" From those discussions, Aerospace established a working group with representatives from industry, academia, and government to look at the launch interface and how standards might improve launch options.

The LaunchU standard not only defines the volume and mass of the satellite, but the center of gravity, first fundamental frequency, and the launch direction, as those requirements can impact complex analyses on the launch vehicle. All of the requirements for LaunchU (e.g., volume, mass, frequency) include the separation system. Spacecraft that meet the LaunchU standard would be able to integrate with any launch vehicle which has designed for the LaunchU compatible spacecraft.

The standard was proposed by The Aerospace Corporation, at the 32nd Small Satellite Conference, in August 2018.

References

External links
 LaunchU at Aerospace Corporation
 Paper: Setting the Standard: Recommendations on “Launch Unit” Standard SmallSat Sizes between CubeSats and ESPA-Class
 Paper: Increased Access to Space with Modularity and Interface Standards

Satellites by type